Maher-shalal-hash-baz was the second mentioned son of the prophet Isaiah in the Hebrew bible.  The phrase may also refer to:
Mahershala Ali (born 1974), American actor
Maher Shalal Hash Baz (band), Japanese art music ensemble led by Tori Kudo